Ludovic Bource (born 19 August 1970 in Pontivy) is a French composer best known for his work in film scoring. He rose to international critical acclaim in 2011 for composing the Golden Globe- and Academy Award-winning score for The Artist.

Life and career
Bource first studied music at a conservatory in Brittany, moving afterwards to the Centre d'Informations Musicales (CIM), in Paris, where he studied Jazz. Bource began his career composing music for commercials, but later moved on to short films, such as, En attendant (2000), Spartacus (2003), and Sirene Song (2005). After working on the Michel Hazanavicius film Mes amis, Bource has become a long-time collaborator with the director. He has since scored such Hazanavicius films as OSS 117: Cairo, Nest of Spies (2006), its sequel OSS 117: Lost in Rio (2009), and most recently the black-and-white silent film The Artist (2011). The latter, recorded with award-winning Brussels Philharmonic, elevated Bource to international fame and earned him numerous accolades, including a César Award, a Golden Globe, and an Oscar. He was invited to join the Academy of Motion Picture Arts and Sciences in June 2012 along with 175 other individuals.

Filmography

References

External links
 

1970 births
Living people
People from Pontivy
Best Original Music BAFTA Award winners
Best Original Music Score Academy Award winners
European Film Award for Best Composer winners
Golden Globe Award-winning musicians
French film score composers
French male film score composers
21st-century French composers
21st-century French male musicians